The Kiranti languages  are a major family of Sino-Tibetan languages spoken in Nepal and India (notably Sikkim, Darjeeling, Kalimpong, and Bhutan) by the Kirati people.

External relationships 
George van Driem had formerly proposed that the Kiranti languages were part of a Mahakiranti family, although specialists are not completely certain of either the existence of a Kiranti subgroup or its precise membership. LaPolla (2003), though, proposes that Kiranti may be part of a larger "Rung" group.

Languages 
There are about two dozen Kiranti languages. The better known are Limbu,  Sunuwar, Bantawa Rai, Chamling Rai, Khaling Rai, Bahing Rai, Yakkha language, Vayu, Dungmali Rai, Lohorung Rai and Kulung Rai.

Kiranti verbs are not easily segmentable, due in large part to the presence of portmanteau morphemes, crowded affix strings, and extensive (and often nonintuitive) allomorphy.

Classification 
Overall, Kiranti languages are:

 Limbu 
 Eastern Kiranti
 Greater Yakkha 
 Yakkha
 Belhare Rai
 Athpare Rai
 Chintang Rai
 Chulung Rai
 Upper Arun River
 Yamphu-Lohorung Rai
 Yamphu Rai
 Lohorung Rai
 Mewahang Rai
 ? Waling Rai †
 Central 
 Khambu (Rai)
 Kulung Rai
 Nachhiring Rai 
 Sampang Rai
 Saam Rai
 Southern 
 Bantawa Rai
 Puma Rai
 Chamling Rai
 Dungmali
 Western 
 Thulung Rai (perhaps a primary branch of Kiranti Rai)
 Chaurasiya
 Wambule Rai
 Jerung Rai
 Upper Dudhkosi River: 
 Khaling Rai
 Dumi Rai
 Koi Rai
 Northwestern 
 Bahing Rai
 Sunuwar
 Vayu

Ethnologue adds Tilung Rai to Western Kiranti, based on Opgenort (2011).

Opgenort (2005) 
Opgenort (2005) classifies the Kiranti languages as follows, and recognizes a basic east-west division within Kiranti.

 Kiranti
 Western
 Hayu
 (branch)
 Thulung
 (branch)
 Bahing, Sunuwar
 Jero, Wambule
 Eastern
 Khaling, Dumi
 (branch)
 Yamphu, Limbu
 (branch)
 Kulung
 Chamling, Bantawa

Gerber & Grollmann (2018) 
Historical linguists, as early as 2012, do not consider Kiranti to be a coherent group, but rather a paraphyletic one due to lack of shared innovations. Gerber & Grollmann (2018) gave a formal proof of the paraphyletic nature of Kiranti. A Central-Eastern Kiranti group is considered to be valid by Gerber & Grollmann (2018), but they consider "Western Kiranti" unclassified within Trans-Himalayan languages.

 Central-Eastern Kiranti
 Lhokpu, Dhimal, Toto
 Central Kiranti
 Upper Arun
 Greater Yakkha-Limbu

Independent branches (formerly part of "Western Kiranti") that are unclassified within Trans-Himalayan (Sino-Tibetan):
 Dumi-Khaling
 Chaurasiya-Northwest: Wambule, Bahing, Sunuwar; ? Jero; ? Hayu
 Thulung-Tilung-Kohi

Sound changes 
Sound changes defining each subgroup (Gerber & Grollmann 2018):
 Central-Eastern Kiranti (*voiceless > preglottalised; *voiced > voiceless; *ʔk > kʰ; *ʔc > cʰ)
 Lhokpu, Dhimal, Toto
 Central Kiranti (*ʔp > b; *ʔt > d)
 Upper Arun (*ʔp > b; *ʔt > d; *r > j)
 Greater Yakkha-Limbu (*ʔp > pʰ; *ʔt > tʰ; *r > j)

Independent branches (formerly part of "Western Kiranti") that are unclassified within Trans-Himalayan (Sino-Tibetan):
 Dumi-Khaling (innovative verbal dual marker -i)
 Chaurasiya-Northwest (*kʷ > ʔw ~ ʔb)
 Wambule, Bahing, Sunuwar; ? Jero; ? Hayu
 Thulung-Tilung-Kohi (*p > t; *b > d)

Reconstruction 
Research on proto-Kiranti includes work on phonology and comparative morphology by van Driem, reconstructions by Michailovsky (1991) and Sergei Starostin 1994. Michailovsky and Starostin differ by the number of stop series reconstructed (three vs four) and the interpretation of the correspondences.

Opgenort introduces the reconstruction of preglottalized resonants; his reconstruction is generally based on Starostin's four series system. More recently, Jacques proposed reconstruction of proto-Kiranti verb roots in a framework following Michailovsky's system, and analyzes the other initial correspondences (in particular, the series reconstructed as non-aspirated unvoiced stops by Starostin) as due to morphological alternations and inter-Kiranti borrowing. In addition, he presents a preliminary discussion of the reconstruction of stem alternation and stress patterns on the basis of Khaling and Dumi.

Notes

References 
 George van Driem (2001) Languages of the Himalayas: An Ethnolinguistic Handbook of the Greater Himalayan Region. Brill.
 
 Tara Mani Rai (2015) "A Grammar of Koyee" Ph.D. diss. Tribhuvan University. 
 
 Graham Thurgood (2003) "A Subgrouping of the Sino-Tibetan Languages:  The Interaction between Language Contact, Change, and Inheritance," The Sino-Tibetan Languages.  Routledge.  pp. 3–21.
 Karen H. Ebert (2003) "Kiranti Languages:  An Overview," The Sino-Tibetan Languages.  Routledge.  pp. 505–517.

Reconstructions
 Michailovsky, Boyd. 1991. Big black notebook of Kiranti, proto-Kiranti forms. (unpublished ms. contributed to STEDT).
 
 A reconstruction of Proto-Kiranti verb roots, supplementary file of Jacques (2017)

Further reading 

Ebert, K. 1994. The structure of Kiranti languages, comparative grammar and texts: Kiranti subordination in the South Asian areal context. Zürich: Arbeiten des Seminars für Allgemeine Sprachwissenschaft (ASAS).

External links 
 Kiranti Database Project (Jean Robert Opgenort)

 
Languages of Koshi Province